Koreshi is an Albanian surname. Notable people with the surname include:

Erlind Koreshi (born 1987), Albanian footballer
Vath Koreshi (1936–2006), Albanian writer and screenwriter

See also
Koresh (disambiguation)

Albanian-language surnames